The Party of the Orthodox was a political party in Latvia during the inter-war period. Primarily representing Russian Orthodox peasants in Latgale, it was led by Archbishop Jānis Pommers.

History
The party won two seats in the 1925 elections, retaining both in the 1928 elections. It was reduced to a single seat in the 1931 elections.

Ideology
The party's ideology was focused on the 1920 land reforms and attempts to revise them in favour of their supporters.

References

Defunct political parties in Latvia
Eastern Orthodox political parties
Eastern Orthodoxy in Latvia
Russian political parties in Latvia